Fraser Lawton is currently Rector, The Church of St. Dunstan (Episcopal), and Assisting Bishop, Diocese of Dallas. Formerly, he was the 11th the Anglican Bishop of Athabasca from 2009-2019, and before that, rector of St Thomas' Anglican Church in Fort McMurray, Alberta.

References

21st-century Anglican Church of Canada bishops
Anglican bishops of Athabasca
Year of birth missing (living people)
Living people